Ahwar District is a district of the Abyan Governorate, Yemen. Its centre is the city of Al-Luha. On the 2004 Census of Yemen, the district had a population of 25,246 inhabitants.

References

Districts of Abyan Governorate